The Centre for Air Power Studies was established as a research think tank on September 15, 2001, under an independent, non-profit, non-governmental trust registered in New Delhi titled “Forum for National Security Studies”, officially registered under the existing regulations in New Delhi U/S 12 A of the IT Act in April 2002 and took over responsibilities for governing as the Centre for Air Power Studies (CAPS).

Situated at the Western Air Command, Subroto Park, New Delhi, CAPS is India’s autonomous think tank that concentrates on subjects and disciplines relevant to the air force, especially on national defence, military affairs and strategy, air power and space and technology issues. It also focuses on national and international issues that have security implications for India. The current Director General (DG) of CAPS is Air Marshal Anil Chopra (Retd.), who took over the office in February 2021.

Governance 
CAPS is governed by a Trust, named Forum for National Security Studies, an independent non-profit, non-governmental body. The Board of Trustees which guides the activities of CAPS is headed by Shri MK Rasgotra, former Foreign Secretary as Chairman, Capt. Ajay Singh, Former Sr. Vice President-Regulatory Compliance Jet Airways and Capital Indigo Airlines, managing Trustee and comprises, Shri Sanjaya Baru Editor–in–Chief Business Standard and former Press Advisor to the Prime Minister, Air Chief Marshal SP Tyagi, former Chief of Air Staff, Air Marshal Bharat Kumar, Air Marshal Anil Chopra, Director General of CAPS, Shri. Parthasarathy, IFS; Chancellor, Central University of Jammu; Former High Commissioner to Pakistan, Australia, Air Marshal Sandeep Singh Vice Chief of the Air Staff IAF, Secretary Defence (Finance).

History  
As Director, IDSA from 1987 to 2001, it fell upon Jasjit Singh to steer informed opinion-making on India’s security and foreign policy during the turbulent period of the end of the Cold War when both the world and India underwent seminal transformations. On retiring from IDSA he established the Centre for Air Power Studies (CAPS), an idea that had taken root in his mind during his tenure at IDSA. He was keen to build scholar warriors by encouraging them to undertake studies on national security, specifically on air power. Higher defence organisation remained a passion for him. He had the ability to identify crucial areas for research. He was DG, CAPS from 2002- 2013.

Aims and Objectives of CAPS 
The main aims and objectives of CAPS are:
a)	Undertake and promote policy-related research, study and discussion on the trends and developments in air power and space for civil and military purposes.
b)	Promote research, study and discussion of military history and trends in warfare with a special focus on the nature and methods of air warfare and the application of force through the medium of air and space.
c)	Study developments in modern technology with a special focus on military aviation and space technologies.
d)	Undertake research, study, and analyses of the role of air power and space capabilities in India’s defence and security.
e)	Undertake studies related to the doctrines and strategies for the developments and employment of air power.
f)	Publish through books, periodical journals, issue briefs and analytical articles, the activities and studies of the Centre and contributions to constructive thought in relevant fields of national security.

Organisational Structure 
The functioning of the CAPS is governed by the Memorandum of Association and rules and regulations approved by the Registrar of Society, New Delhi.

Board of Advisors
The Board provides the policies, and guidelines under which CAPS operates.

Executive Committee (EC)
The EC of CAPS is appointed by the Board. It provides guidelines to the DG to run the Centre and its activities.

Director General (DG)
The DG of CAPS is also the CEO and is responsible for all administrative and professional aspects. The current DG of CAPS is Air Marshal Anil Chopra PVSM AVSM VM VSM (Retd.) since February 2021.

Additional Director General (ADG)
ADG supports all the functions of the DG and deputies for him in his absence. The current ADG of the centre is Air Vice Marshal Anil Golani (Retd.). He is also the Vertical head of Aerospace. 

Distinguished Fellows (DF)
DFs undertake high-quality research work, besides mentoring scholars and handling various projects. Current Distinguished Fellows at the Centre are Dr Manpreet Sethi and Dr Shalini Chawla, who are the vertical heads of the Nuclear Group and Afghanistan-Pakistan Study Group. 

Research Scholars
CAPS research faculty comprises experienced serving and retired officers of the Defence Services of India as well as Civilian research scholars who are employed according to their academic qualifications and work experience. The following research positions are involved- Senior Fellow (SF), Research Fellow (RF), Associate Fellow (AF), and Research Associate (RA).

Interns
CAPS provides an opportunity to graduate and postgraduate students to intern for short-term periods. Each intern work on a focused subject under a CAPS mentor and has the chance to give a presentation to the CAPS faculty at the end of his/her term.

Seminar/Conferences/Round Table 

CAPS conduct panel discussions and annual seminars/ webinars on a national and international level. Amongst the prominent flagship seminars of the centre are the Jumbo Mujumdar International Conference; Indian Aerospace Industry seminar in association with the Confederation of Indian Industries (CII) and Indian Air Force (1AF), Subroto Mukerjee International Seminar, National Seminar on Af-Pak, National Seminar on Nuclear Strategy, and National Seminar on Nuclear Power. The Centre has also initiated an annual seminar in honour of its founder Director General, Air Commodore Jasjit Singh. CAPS also hosts guest talks by scholars of national and international repute on a regular basis.
Each member of the CAPS Research faculty has an opportunity to present his/her research through a Fellow seminar/webinar to share research findings and receive feedback from the senior and fellow scholars. 
As part of its effort to build scholar warriors and to raise the national security consciousness of the country. CAPS held the following capsules: 
a.	Nuclear Strategy capsule for senior officers
b.	Squadron Officers capsule for mid-level IAF officers
c.	University Students capsule for Master and Doctoral students
d.	School students capsule for higher secondary students.

Books and Publications 
CAPS publishes two quarterly journals, Air Power Journal and Defence and Diplomacy, written by scholars from CAPS and outside. CAPS also publishes the fortnightly newsletter Nuclear Security which covers interrelated areas of nuclear power and nuclear strategy. Similar newsletters have also been published on aerospace power and the Indo-Pacific region. CAPS also produces short articles focused on current topics on national security, which are distributed to leading think tanks, academic institutions and governmental departments. CAPS Expert View is an e-publication offering analysis of recent events.

Social Media 
The centre’s website (www.capsindia.org) is regularly updated about functions and publications. CAPS is active on social media platforms such as Twitter, Facebook and YouTube. Periodic Podcasts called are also uploaded on relevant subjects.
CAPS Website - https://capsindia.org  
Twitter: @CAPS_INDIA 
Facebook: https://www.facebook.com/centreforairpowerstudies/

Library 
The Centre has a well-stocked professional library. It has built up a collection of over 10,000 books. It also is a repository of journals through subscriptions, gifts and exchanges. The library has access to the e-resources available on the J-STOR. The library archives various Conferences, Seminars and Reports organised and published by CAPS in CD/DVD form. Facilities for interlibrary loans are also available for research faculty. The Online Public Access Catalogue (OPAC) is available on the Web and provides bibliographical information about the books.

Non-profit organisations based in India
New Delhi
Air Force Research Laboratory projects